Guan, literally translated as hat or cap or crown in English, is a general term which refers to a type of headwear in Hanfu which covers a small area of the upper part of the head instead of the entire head. The  was typically a formal form of headwear which was worn together with its corresponding court dress attire.

Cultural significance and symbolism 

The code of wearing  forms a crucial aspect of the Hanfu system. In ancient China, Han Chinese men had to undergo a capping ceremony called  as their coming of age ceremony where a guan was placed on their head by a respected elder. The  started by the nobles of the Zhou dynasty and eventually spread to the civilians. The  was eventually forcefully ended during the Qing dynasty.

History 

These laws, however, varied from dynasty to dynasty.

Zhou dynasty 

The  was the highest rank of guan and could only be worn by the rulers, the feudal lords and nobles in sacrificial ceremonies, such as the Heaven worshipping ceremony and the ancestors worshipping ceremony, and in conferring ceremony. The  followed strict regulations based on social hierarchy with the number of beads tassels indicating the ranks of its wearer; for example, the Emperor wore twelve beads tassels while the lowest rank officials wore only two beads tassels. The  was red and black in colour. The  was decorated with 12 beams of white deer-skin, had an arched top, wide edges, and was decorated with many colourful jades in its seams.

Warring States period 

During the Warring States period, King Wuling of Zhao adopted the  policy and a -style  which looks similar to the conical hat of the Scythian was adopted. King Wuling's  -style  was less pointy than the actual Scythian hat and he decorated his hat with a marten tail to denote his noble status. The King of Qin later give the -style  of King Wuling to his servant as an insult to King Wuling after the latter had destroyed the regime of the Zhao state. Many years later, the  evolved into the military cap called . 

The  was possibly derived from the -style  adopted by King Wuling through  policy. The snow pheasant was a symbolism of martial valour and courage due to its association with the snow pheasant which would fight its opponent until death.

Qin dynasty 
In the Qin dynasty, the  continued to be worn to distinguish military officers; by that time onward, the use of  had spread throughout the whole empire.

Han dynasty 

In the Han dynasty, only people from distinguished background were allowed to wear . The  was decorated with two pheasant feathers on either sides and was worn by specialized member of the Han dynasty military.

Sui dynasty 
Emperor Wendi of Sui established a new attire system by basing himself on the system of the Cao Wei, Western Jin, and Northern Qi dynasties; however the Sui dynasty system was incomplete. It was under Emperor Yangdi that more reforms took place in accordance with the ancient traditions and that the appearance of the ritual headwear were reformed. 

The  continued to be worn by the Emperor Yangdi. He also wore  (弁冠) which was distinguished by a gold mountain-symbol called  (博山). The  became the favourite  of the Emperor Yangdi when he went on cuttings; such as hunting trips, military expeditions, and other related ceremonies.

The  (進賢冠) was worn by the civil officials at the court.

Tang dynasty 

Song dynasty 
In the Song dynasty, the Emperor wore the  while the crown prince wore  (遠遊冠). The  was worn by the literati which continued the long tradition.

Ming dynasty 
The emperor wore  (翼善冠).

Types of historical guan 

 Diaochanguan (貂蟬冠) / longjin
 
  (鶡冠) –  a military guan decorated with pheasant feathers.
 
 
  (弁冠):  and 
  
  (束发冠) – a type of 
 Tongtianguan/ 
 /  (大冠)/  (武弁大冠) –  was derived from the 
 
 / faguan
  (翼善冠)
  (遠遊冠)
  (趙惠文冠)

Gallery

See also 

 Guan Li

 Hanfu
 List of Hanfu headwear

Notes

References 

Hanfu
Chinese headgear